SRN or Srn may refer to:

 SR.N (Saunders-Roe Nautical), a series of hovercraft produced by Saunders-Roe:
SR.N1, the first modern hovercraft
SR.N2, the first hovercraft to operate a commercial service
SR.N3, the first hovercraft designed for military use
SR.N4, a large four-prop ferry hovercraft
SR.N5, a river patrol hovercraft used in Vietnam
SR.N6, a longer SR.N5
 SRN1 mechanism, a radical-nucleophilic aromatic substitution in organic chemistry
 Salem Radio Network, a United States-based Christian radio network
 Scottish Recovery Network, an initiative designed to raise awareness of recovery from mental disorders
 Simple recurrent network, a type of recurrent neural network
 Sranan Tongo, a Creole language, ISN-639 code
 A state registered nurse in the United Kingdom
 Union of the Russian People (Soyuz Russkogo Naroda), a Black-Hundredist political organization in the Russian Empire, c. 1905–1917
 Strahan Airport, IATA airport code "SRN"